Kibogo is a settlement in the Kisumu region of Kenya's Central Province.

Climate 
The climate of Central Province is generally cooler than that of the rest of Kenya, due to the region's higher altitude. Rainfall is fairly reliable, falling in two seasons, one from early March to May (the long rains) and a second during October and November (the short rains).

References 

Populated places in Central Province (Kenya)